Sir Christopher John Bryant (born 11 January 1962) is a British politician and former Anglican priest who is the chair of the Committees on Standards and Privileges. He previously served in government as Deputy Leader of the House of Commons from 2008 to 2009 and Under-Secretary of State for Europe and Asia from 2009 to 2010. A member of the Labour Party, he has been Member of Parliament (MP) for Rhondda since 2001.

Born in Cardiff, Bryant was privately educated at Cheltenham College before studying English at Mansfield College, Oxford. After graduating with a further degree in theology, he worked as a Church of England priest as well as having roles at the BBC and Common Purpose. He was elected for Rhondda at the 2001 general election. He served in the Shadow Cabinet as Shadow Culture Secretary in 2015 and Shadow Leader of the House of Commons from 2015 to 2016, before resigning in protest at Jeremy Corbyn's leadership.

Early life
Chris Bryant was born in Cardiff, Wales, to a Scottish mother and a Welsh father. Bryant grew up in Cardiff (where his father worked for five years), Spain for five years in the 1960s (leading to his speaking fluent Spanish), and Cheltenham, Gloucestershire. He was educated at Cheltenham College, an independent school for boys in Cheltenham, and at Mansfield College, Oxford, where he read English.

Although initially a member of the Conservative Party, and an elected office-holder in the Oxford University Conservative Association, he joined the Labour Party in 1986 after leaving Oxford.

Anglican ministry
After completing his first degree, Bryant began his training to be a priest in the Church of England at Ripon College Cuddesdon in Oxfordshire. There, he obtained a further degree in theology.

He was ordained deacon in 1986 and priest in 1987. He served as a curate at the Church of All Saints, High Wycombe from 1986 to 1989 and then as a Youth Chaplain in Peterborough, as well as travelling in Latin America.

In 1991, Bryant left the ordained ministry, after deciding that being gay and being a priest were incompatible. Statements made by Richard Harries, the then-Bishop of Oxford also influenced his decision.

Early political career
After leaving the priesthood in 1991, Bryant made a radical career move and began work as the election agent to the Holborn and St Pancras Constituency Labour Party, where he helped Frank Dobson hold his seat in the 1992 general election. From 1993, he was Local Government Officer for the Labour Party; he lived in Hackney and was elected to Hackney Borough Council in 1993, representing Leabridge ward and serving until 1998. He became Chairman of the Christian Socialist Movement. From 1994 to 1996, he was London manager of the charity Common Purpose.

In 1996, he became a full-time author, writing biographies of Stafford Cripps and Glenda Jackson. He was Labour candidate for Wycombe in the 1997 general election (where he lost by 2,370 votes), and Head of European Affairs for the BBC from 1998.

Parliamentary career
His selection for the very safe Labour seat of Rhondda in South Wales in 2000 surprised many people given Bryant's background – gay, a former Anglican cleric, and someone who had been a Conservative as a student. He says of his surprise selection, "I fell off the chair, and my opponents certainly did". Fifty-two people applied for the candidature and a local councillor was hot favourite to win. He retained the seat comfortably at the 2001 general election with a 16,047 majority, one of the largest in the country.

In 2003, Bryant voted for participation in the Iraq war.  He is a member of the Labour Friends of Israel and Labour Friends of Palestine and the Middle East group.

From 2004 until 2007, Bryant was chairman of the Labour Movement for Europe, succeeded by Mary Creagh MP. Bryant is a signatory of the Henry Jackson Society principles.

On 5 September 2006, with Siôn Simon, he coordinated a prominent letter which was signed by 15 Labour backbenchers calling for Tony Blair's immediate resignation.

Bryant was the Parliamentary Private Secretary to the Secretary of State for Constitutional Affairs Charlie Falconer. In Gordon Brown's autumn 2008 reshuffle, Bryant was promoted from his role as Parliamentary Private Secretary to Harriet Harman to the ministerial position of Deputy Leader of the House of Commons otherwise known as Parliamentary Secretary to the House of Commons. This was followed by another move in the June 2009 reshuffle, when he moved to the Foreign and Commonwealth Office as the Parliamentary Under-Secretary of State for Foreign Affairs. On 13 October 2009, he was also appointed Minister for Europe.

Phone hacking scandal

On 11 March 2003, as part of an Enquiry into Privacy and Press Intrusion by the Commons Select Committee on Culture, Media and Sport, he asked Rebekah Wade (now Brooks) whether she had ever paid police officers for information. Seated beside Andy Coulson, the editor of the News of the World, she said 'yes'.  Bryant had his phone hacked later that year by the News of the World, a fact which became known to the Metropolitan Police when they seized material from the private investigator Glenn Mulcaire. Bryant, along with John Prescott and Brian Paddick, sought judicial review of the Metropolitan Police in an attempt to force them to contact all the victims of phone hacking by the News of the World. The Metropolitan Police accepted their liability and he won damages of £30,000 from News International in 2012.

Bryant called for and led the parliamentary debates on referring the phone hacking scandal to the Standards and Privileges Committee on 9 September 2010, and the Emergency Debate on whether there should be a judge led enquiry on 6 July 2011 which led to the setting up of the Leveson Inquiry.

Expenses claims scandal

Bryant claimed over £92,000 in expenses over the five years leading up to the 2009 scandal over MPs' expenses. During that time he flipped his second-home expenses twice. He claimed mortgage interest expenses that started at £7,800 per year before rising (after flipping) to £12,000 per year. He also claimed £6,400 in stamp duty and other fees on his most recent purchase, and £6,000 per year in service charges.

In opposition
In October 2010, Bryant stood as one of 49 candidates for election to the 19 places in the Shadow Cabinet in the internal Labour Party poll, receiving 77 votes, 29th position on the list.

In October 2010, Bryant described the coalition government's housing benefit reforms as poorer people "being socially engineered and sociologically cleansed out of London". The use of the term "cleansing" was criticised by members of the coalition, including deputy prime minister Nick Clegg, who called Bryant's comment "offensive to people who had witnessed ethnic cleansing in other parts of the world".

In 2011, in the House of Commons, he criticised Prince Andrew, Duke of York for a number of alleged indiscretions.

Bryant won the Stonewall Politician of the Year Award in 2011 for his work to support equality for lesbian, gay and bisexual people. He was given a score of 100% in favour of lesbian, gay and bisexual equality by Stonewall. On 5 February 2013, he voted in favour in the House of Commons Second Reading vote on same-sex marriage in Britain.

Following the Russian annexation of Crimea in 2014, Bryant told the Commons 'I am afraid that the international response... has thus far been pitiful and spineless. People have even trotted out in this Chamber the argument that most of the people in Crimea are Russian speaking and wanted to join Russia in the first place. Can Members not hear history running through the decades?... There has been little honour in the way that Britain, France and the United States, having signed up to the Budapest memorandum, which guaranteed the territorial integrity of Ukraine, now make lots of great speeches but introduce the measliest level of sanctions and targeted interventions against Russian individuals... A Russian friend of mine says that Putin is not yet mad. That may be true, but what will our surrendering and our appeasement do for his sanity?'

In December 2014, Bryant was moved from Shadow Minister for Welfare Reform to Shadow Minister for the Arts. In this position, he suggested in January 2015 that too many successful artists such as "James Blunt and their ilk" had been educated at private schools, and that he wanted to see more encouragement for the arts for people from a variety of backgrounds, even though Bryant himself attended a private school. Blunt said that Bryant was a "narrow-minded 'classist gimp' who was motivated by the 'politics of jealousy'"; Bryant responded by claiming that Blunt should not be "so blooming precious" and that he was not "knocking [his] success" but attempting to draw attention to the lack of diversity in the arts.

In September 2015, following Jeremy Corbyn's election as Labour Party leader, Bryant was appointed Shadow Leader of the House of Commons. He resigned from this position on 26 June 2016, along with other shadow ministers after the Brexit vote. He supported Owen Smith in the failed attempt to replace Jeremy Corbyn in the 2016 Labour Party leadership election.

He supported Remain in the EU referendum in June 2016 and voted against the triggering of Article 50 in February 2017.

In January 2017, as ex-chair of the all-party parliamentary group for Russia, Bryant claimed that the Russian government orchestrated a homophobic campaign to remove him from this position, saying that the Russian government has acquired kompromat on high-profile Conservative Party MPs including Boris Johnson, Liam Fox, Alan Duncan and David Davis.

On 12 January 2017, Bryant bemused his fellow MPs and Speaker of the House John Bercow, when he wished Bercow happy "kiss a ginger day", during business questions.

Following the general election in 2017, Bryant came first in the ballot for Private Members Bills, and after consulting his constituents introduced the Assaults on Emergency Workers (Offences) Bill, which introduced a new offence of assaulting an emergency worker. It received royal assent on 13 November 2018 as the Assaults on Emergency Workers (Offences) Act 2018.

In November 2017, Bryant called for the arrest of the President of the United States, Donald Trump, if he travels to the United Kingdom, after the President shared a comment on the social media website Twitter from a member of the far-right group Britain First that related to radical Islamic events. Bryant stated: "The Prime Minister should make it absolutely clear that if Donald Trump comes to this country he'll be arrested for inciting religious hatred and therefore he'd be better off not coming at all."

Following John Bercow's resignation as Speaker of the House of Commons on 31 October 2019, Bryant stood in the election a new speaker on 4 November 2019, losing to Lindsay Hoyle by 213 to 325.

In December 2020, Bryant became engaged in a row with the Commons speaker, Lindsay Hoyle. The disturbance started with Bryant heckling the Prime Minister while standing near to a door. The Speaker informed Bryant that social distancing rules meant he needed to move and he then instructed Bryant to sit in one of the seats intended for use by MPs. Some of those present thought that Bryant then uttered an offensive expletive back to the Speaker although Bryant denied this. Bryant then exited the chamber of the Commons while the Speaker called for him. Some moments after the Speaker had denounced Bryant's "disgraceful behaviour", Bryant returned to the chamber to engage in what appeared to be a heated discussion with the speaker. Hoyle said: "Mr Bryant, I think we need to have this conversation later" and Bryant left the chamber.

In May 2020, Bryant was elected as the Chair of the Commons Select Committee on Standards and Commons Select Committee of Privileges, . In October 2021, he chaired the Standards Committee's decision on the sanction to be applied to Owen Paterson for breaching lobbying rules relating to paid advocacy which triggered the parliamentary second jobs controversy. In April 2022, due to having already expressed views about the Partygate scandal, Bryant recused himself from the subsequent investigation by the Privileges Committee into whether Boris Johnson had committed contempt of parliament over statements to the House of Commons concerning alleged parties.

Bryant came tenth in the Private Members Bill ballot in the 2021-2 Session of Parliament and introduced the Acquired Brain Injury Bill on 10 November 2021, which would require the Government to produce, implement and review a national strategy for acquired brain injury.  He withdrew the Bill when the Secretary of State for Health and Social Care, Sajid Javid, announced that Bryant and Gillian Keegan, the minister for Care and Mental Health, would co-chair a cross-government programme board to draw up a national strategy in December 2021.  Keegan said: “All Government departments are invited to join the board. The strategy will be kept under review and revised periodically, to ensure it continues to reflect the priority areas and actions needed to support those living with ABI, and their families.” 

In December 2021, Bryant told the BBC in an interview that he felt "less physically safe as a gay man than he did 30 years ago." While denying that Boris Johnson himself was homophobic, he accused those around him of being happy to "stir the pot." As evidence, he cited the government's stance on transgender people and their attitude towards conversion therapy.

Bryant campaigned for the UK Government to introduce Magnitsky Sanctions on those who abuse human rights around the world and co-chairs the All Party Parliamentary Group on Magnitsky Sanctions with Sir Iain Duncan Smith MP and is a Member of the Foreign Affairs Select Committee. He is a Fellow of the Society of Antiquaries of London.

Personal life
Bryant entered into a civil partnership with Jared Cranney on 27 March 2010. The ceremony was the first civil partnership ever held in the Houses of Parliament. They are now married. Bryant lives in Porth in the Rhondda.

He was ridiculed by the press in 2003 when he posted a picture of himself wearing only underpants on a gay dating site, Gaydar. Bryant later reflected upon the affair, saying, "It was a wound but it's a rather charming scar now. I had a period when I barely slept and it was horrible, but I'm very lucky in having a supportive set of friends – MP friends and others – and they looked after me." At the time, the media predicted that he would not survive, and there was much talk of his possible deselection. In 2013, he reflected on the incident, saying that the whole affair actually boosted his majority as an MP.

On 25 September 2006, The Guardian ran four spoof diary articles called "Chris Bryant's Manchester Diary". The newspaper later printed a clarification to confirm that these were parodies, and were not written by Bryant.

In March 2019, Bryant said that he had undergone surgery for skin cancer.

On 1 May 2022, Bryant stated that he had been groped and "touched up" by older male MPs early in his career in the House of Commons.

Honours
Bryant was knighted in the 2023 New Year Honours for political and public service.

Publications
 Entitled: A Critical History of the British Aristocracy by Chris Bryant, 2017, Doubleday 
 Parliament: The Biography: Reform (Vol. 2) by Chris Bryant, 2014, Doubleday, 
 Parliament: The Biography: Ancestral Voices (Vol. 1) by Chris Bryant, 2014, Doubleday, 
 Glenda Jackson: The Biography by Chris Bryant, 1999, HarperCollins, 
 Stafford Cripps: The First Modern Chancellor by Chris Bryant, 1997, Hodder & Stoughton Ltd, 
 Possible Dreams: Personal History of the British Christian Socialists by Chris Bryant, 1996, Hodder & Stoughton Religious, 
 The Glamour Boys: The Secret Story of the Rebels who Fought for Britain to Defeat Hitler by Chris Bryant, 2020, Bloomsbury Publishing,

References

External links
Chris Bryant MP official constituency website
Chris Bryant MP Welsh Labour Party profile

|-

|-

|-

|-

|-

|-

|-

|-

|-

1962 births
Living people
People educated at Cheltenham College
Alumni of Ripon College Cuddesdon
Alumni of Mansfield College, Oxford
20th-century Church of England clergy
20th-century Welsh Anglican priests
Anglican socialists
BBC executives
Councillors in the London Borough of Hackney
Gay politicians
Welsh Labour Party MPs
Labour Friends of Israel
Labour Friends of Palestine and the Middle East
LGBT Anglicans
LGBT members of the Parliament of the United Kingdom
Welsh LGBT politicians
UK MPs 2001–2005
UK MPs 2005–2010
UK MPs 2010–2015
UK MPs 2015–2017
UK MPs 2017–2019
Welsh Christian socialists
Welsh people of Scottish descent
Conservative Party (UK) people
UK MPs 2019–present
English LGBT politicians
Labour Party (UK) councillors
21st-century Welsh historians
Welsh biographers
Knights Bachelor
Politicians awarded knighthoods
21st-century Welsh LGBT people
English Anglican priests
LGBT Anglican clergy